Brännö is an island in the Southern Göteborg Archipelago and a locality situated in Göteborg Municipality, Västra Götaland County, Sweden. It had 708 inhabitants in 2010 and belongs to the parish of Styrsö within Gothenburg Municipality.

History
Due to its geographical location, Brännö has throughout the centuries been a strategic location for seafarers and chieftains, from both Sweden and the adjacent Norway and Denmark.

It is believed that its inhabitants are the same as the Brondings who are referred to in the Anglo-Saxon poems Beowulf and Widsith. Beowulf, England's national epic, relates that Breca the Bronding was the childhood friend of the hero Beowulf and Widsith tells that Breca later was the lord of the Brondings.[1]

Brännö is mentioned in the icelandic Sagas as the location of several important thing assemblies in the Viking Age and later.[2]  The Laxdæla saga relates that the beautiful Irish princess Melkorka was sold as a thrall to the Icelandic chieftain Hoskuld Dala-Kollsson, during a fair on Brännö, in the 10th century.

The jetty on the island is also mentioned in the song De' ä' dans på Brännö brygga.

References

External links 
Note 1: The Anglo-Saxon Dictionary, the posthumous dictionary by Joseph Bosworth (1898), see bróc - brot 
Note 2:  Brännö History Local fan site dedicated to Brännö (in Swedish)

Populated places in Västra Götaland County
Populated places in Gothenburg Municipality
Southern Gothenburg Archipelago
Islands of Västra Götaland County
Saga locations